Jeff Wiska (born October 17, 1959) is a former American football guard. He graduated from Detroit Catholic Central High School and earned a scholarship to Michigan State University where he started at left tackle. He was Drafted by the New York Giants in the 7th round of the 1982 NFL draft. Wiska also played for the Michigan Panthers in 1984, the Oakland Invaders in 1985, the Cleveland Browns in 1986 and for the Miami Dolphins in 1987. Wiska has two sons that played collegiately: Eldest, Ryon was an All-Academic GLIAC conference offensive lineman for Hillsdale College. Youngest, Garrett Wiska was a record breaking and all GLIAC conference fullback for Wayne State University.

References

1959 births
Living people
American football offensive guards
Michigan State Spartans football players
Michigan Panthers players
Oakland Invaders players
Cleveland Browns players
Miami Dolphins players